Rawiri Wikuki Waititi (born ) is a New Zealand politician, iwi leader, Ringatū minister, and kapa haka exponent. He is a co-leader of Te Pāti Māori alongside Debbie Ngarewa-Packer and has served as the Member of Parliament (MP) for  since 2020. A member of Te Pāti Māori, his election to the New Zealand Parliament returned the party to parliamentary politics following their defeat at the 2017 general election.

Personal life
Waititi was born in the Eastern Bay of Plenty area, the oldest of Winston and Florence Waititi's four children. He spent his first 12 years living in Whangaparāoa and was schooled under the guidance of his kaumātua (elders) and his hapū, Te Whānau a Kauaetangohia. It was here he went to kōhanga reo and Te Kura Mana Māori o Whangaparāoa, before he moved to West Auckland to live with his paternal aunt, June Mariu, in Te Atatū North (now Te Atatū Peninsula). He did his secondary schooling at Rutherford High School (now Rutherford College) alongside another politician, Simon Bridges.

Waititi is of the Te Whānau a Apanui, Ngāi Tai, Te Whakatōhea, Ngāi Tūhoe, Ngāti Awa, Te Arawa, Ngāti Tūwharetoa, Ngāi Te Rangi and Ngāti Ranginui iwi. He is a father of five and husband to Kiri Tamihere-Waititi, the daughter of John Tamihere. He is the grandnephew of Hoani Waititi.

Political career

Labour Party, 2014–2016
As he was not placed on the Labour Party list, his only way to Parliament was to win Waiariki, however, he lost the seat of Waiariki to Māori Party co-leader Te Ururoa Flavell.

Defection to the Māori Party
In 2016, following Kīngi Tūheitia Paki's speech backing the Māori Party, Waititi announced he would be supporting the Māori Party.

2020 general election
Following his nomination, Waititi said that there was "an imminent need, now more than ever that Māori have a voice who solely prioritises their aspirations and their needs and that is unapologetic about doing so. The Māori Party is the only party who can do that." At the 2020 election, Waititi successfully unseated the Labour MP Tāmati Coffey, winning by 836 votes, and became the MP for Waiariki.

The final election results showed that the Māori Party had won 1.2% of the party vote, entitling them to two seats, so Waititi's electorate win meant not only his entry to Parliament, but also that of female co-leader Debbie Ngarewa-Packer. Of the forty-two new MPs elected to the 53rd Parliament, two are from the Māori Party.

Under the Māori Party's constitution, its co-leaders must be drawn from its MPs first, with one male and one female co-leader. At a special general meeting of the party on 28 October 2020, Waititi was confirmed as the male co-leader, replacing his father-in-law, John Tamihere.

First term
Before being sworn in to the 53rd parliament, Waititi performed a waerea to protest being required to pledge allegiance to Queen Elizabeth II without reference to the Treaty of Waitangi. On 26 November, Waititi and Ngarewa-Packer walked out of Parliament after the Speaker of the House Trevor Mallard declined his motion that the Māori Party be allowed to speak for 15 minutes during the opening on Parliament on the grounds that MPs from smaller parties were not scheduled to deliver their maiden speeches until the following week. Waititi described Mallard's decision and the parliamentary system as unfair.

In late December 2020 and early January, Waititi participated in negotiations with 16 prisoners who were involved in unrest at Waikeria Prison stemming from allegations of inhumane and unhygienic conditions at the prison. Several of the prisoners had requested the presence of a Māori leader such as Waititi as a prerequisite to ending the unrest. He stated, "these men belong to whanau... that they deserve the right to be treated humanely, with fresh water, food and clean clothing and they deserve to have someone advocating for them." Following five days of unrest, the prisoners surrendered to the authorities following negotiations involving Waititi.

On 9 February, Waititi was ejected from Parliamentary proceedings by Speaker Mallard for refusing to wear a necktie in line with Parliament's business attire dress core. Waititi instead wore a hei tiki necktie, which he described as Māori business attire. Waititi had earlier criticised wearing neckties, describing them as "colonial noose[s]" during his maiden speech last year. When Waititi attempted to ask Corrections Minister Kelvin Davis a supplementary question, Mallard denied him permission to speak since he was not wearing a tie. When Waititi sought a point of order, Mallard ordered him to leave. Waititi was supported by fellow Māori Party MP Ngarewa-Packer, who wore a tie in mockery of the rules. The following day, a Standing Orders meeting accepted a Māori Party submission proposing the elimination of neckties from Parliament's business attire. As a result, Mallard announced that it would no longer be compulsory to wear ties in Parliament. Billionaire Virgin Group founder Richard Branson praised Waititi's actions, describing the rule around neckties as "archaic."

On 12 May, Waititi was ejected from parliamentary proceedings following a heated argument with the opposition National Party leader Judith Collins about the proposed creation of a Māori Health Authority. In the past two weeks, National had alleged the Labour Government was promoting a "separatist agenda" through the Māori Health Authority and other policies seeking to fulfil partnership responsibilities under the Treaty of Waitangi. Waititi accused Collins of racism and sought to raise a point of order about indigenous rights. When his point of order was denied by the Speaker Mallard, Waititi performed a haka in protest, prompting the Speaker to order him to leave Parliament. Waititi left with Māori Party co-leader Ngarewa-Packer and Green MP Teanau Tuiono, who expressed solidarity with him.

In October 2021, Waititi criticised the Government's abandonment of its previous COVID-19 elimination strategy and expressed concerns that the new COVID-19 Protection Framework was insufficient in protecting Māori and boosting the Māori vaccination rate.

In September 2022, Waititi and fellow Māori Party MP Ngarewa-Packer voted against the Queen Elizabeth II Memorial Day Act 2022, which  created a once-off public holiday on 26 September to commemorate the passing of Queen Elizabeth II. Waititi objected to the holiday on the grounds that Māori leaders had not been accorded the same level of respect and criticised the British royal family for not apologising for British imperialism and genocide. Waititi's remarks were criticised as insensitive and disrespectful by National Party MPs Michael Woodhouse and Judith Collins.

Views and positions

Abortion
Waititi voted in favour of the Contraception, Sterilisation, and Abortion (Safe Areas) Amendment Act 2022, which established safe zones around abortion providers.

Conversion therapy
Waititi has supported the Conversion Practices Prohibition Legislation Act 2022, which banned conversion therapy. During the Bill's first reading in August 2022, he claimed that conversion therapy was based on European colonial ideas about gender and sexuality that were alien to Māori people.

Russian invasion of Ukraine
In  March 2022, Waititi supported the Russia Sanctions Act 2022, which created an autonomous sanctions regime in response to the 2022 Russian invasion of Ukraine. While condemning the Russian invasion of Ukraine, he also questioned New Zealand's failure to condemn the United States' invasions of Afghanistan and Iraq, and the Israeli occupation of Palestine.

References

External links
Māori Party profile
Profile at New Zealand Parliament website

|-

1980s births
Living people
Māori Party MPs
New Zealand MPs for Māori electorates
Ngāti Ranginui people
Te Whānau-ā-Apanui people
Whakatōhea people
Ngāi Tūhoe people
Ngāti Awa people
Te Arawa people
Ngāti Tūwharetoa people
Ngāi Te Rangi people
People from Ōpōtiki
Māori Party co-leaders
Rawiri